Giangos Simantiris, also known as Yango Simantiri, (5 February 1940 – 9 March 2007) was a footballer who played international football for both Israel and Greece. He played as a defender for Hapoel Haifa and Olympiacos.

References

1940 births
2007 deaths
Israeli footballers
Israel international footballers
Greek footballers
Greek expatriate footballers
Greece international footballers
Dual internationalists (football)
Hapoel Haifa F.C. players
Olympiacos F.C. players
Association football defenders
Footballers from Haifa